GBA-22 (Ghanche-I) is a constituency of Gilgit Baltistan Assembly which is currently represented by Mushtaq Hussain.

Members

Election results

2009
Muhammad Jaffer of PPP became member of assembly by getting 3,772 votes.

2015
Muhammad Ibrahim Sanai of PML-N won this seat by getting 11,382 votes.

References

Gilgit-Baltistan Legislative Assembly constituencies